WJCT (channel 7), branded on air as Jax PBS, is a PBS member television station in Jacksonville, Florida, United States. It is owned by WJCT, Inc., alongside NPR member WJCT-FM (89.9). The two outlets share studios on Festival Park Avenue in Downtown Jacksonville's Stadium District; the TV station's transmitter is located on Hogan Road in the city's Killarney Shores section.

History

Before the airwaves
In 1952, Dr. Heywood Dowling, a local podiatrist, learned that the Federal Communications Commission (FCC) had reserved 242 local television channels for non-commercial educational use, including the allocation for channel 7 for Jacksonville. Dowling then undertook a six-year campaign to license and fund an educational television station for the First Coast region. His efforts were successful, and WJCT signed on the air on September 10, 1958.

Today in the Legislature
In 1973, Florida Public Broadcasting, a joint venture between WJCT and Tallahassee PBS station WFSU-TV, under the aegis of the Florida Public Broadcasting Service, began a program covering the Florida Legislature, which was syndicated to Florida's eight PBS member stations, from a mobile facility located on the grounds of the State Capitol. The program, Today in the Legislature, was the first of its kind in the United States, preceding legislative programs in other states, and U.S. Congressional coverage by C-SPAN.

Reaction to the first year of the program was positive. The state legislature dedicated funds to expand the program, managed exclusively by WJCT. Production facilities migrated into the (old) Capitol building, with engineering and studio facilities constructed on the third floor. The first broadcast from the new facility was on April 2, 1974. Today in the Legislature expanded into an hour-long weekday program during the legislative session, with a one-hour Spanish language summary, Hoy en la Legislatura produced on Fridays as well as a sign language program. It was hosted by veteran broadcaster Jim Lewis, with additional commentary by Elizabeth "Bib" Willis. Research, engineering, and production crews were composed chiefly of recent graduates from the Florida State University Department of Communications (now the Florida State University College of Motion Picture, Television and Recording Arts), nearly all under the age of 25, including producer Elliott C. Mitchell and director John P. Leu, as well as future Georgia legislator Chesley V. Morton, who worked as a still photographer and camera operator for the program. Today in the Legislature was described as a "unique blend of television of record and more conventional news coverage." A research study concluded that the program generated more positive attitudes about the legislature and increased political knowledge in adolescents who viewed the broadcast, although only 12% found the programming to be "interesting".

Rebranding
On February 24, 2021, the station re-branded as Jax PBS, adopting the current PBS corporate logo in the process.

Technical information

Subchannels
The station's digital signal is multiplexed:

Analog-to-digital transition
WJCT discontinued analog broadcasting on April 6, 2009, ahead of the federally-mandated deadline on June 12.

WJCT-HD4 carries The Florida Channel during its broadcast day (6:00 a.m. to 6:00 p.m. on weekdays); the subchannel otherwise broadcasts a secondary schedule of WJCT and PBS programs under the branding "Jax PBS More!". The subchannel formerly carried Florida Knowledge Network in the same time period (with its remaining airtime filled by "WJCT International") until its closure in 2011.

References

External links

PBS member stations
Television channels and stations established in 1958
JCT (TV)
1958 establishments in Florida